Aoife O'Connor is a camogie player, Winner of All-Ireland Senior medals in 2007, 2010 and 2011 and captain of the Wexford team that won the National Camogie League in 2009 on the week that she married.<ref>25 April 2009 Wexford 2-12 Tipperary 0-11 report in Irish Independent,  Irish Times and on Camogie.ie</</ref>

Marriage
O'Connor married RTÉ Sunday Game analyst Declan Ruth on Friday. O'Connor postponed her honeymoon to Monday next in order to captain the Wexford senior camogie team who play Tipperary in the 2009 National League final. She is daughter of Teddy O'Connor, All-Ireland senior medal winner with Wexford in 1968. Her sister, Claire, is a Senior team colleague, while their three other sisters - Niamh, Ciara and Eimear - all won National League Division two medals in April.

Other honours
National League Division one 2009 (when she captained the team); Winner of All-Ireland Senior club medal in 1995; three Leinster Senior Club 1995, 1996, 2000; Club Senior 1995, 1996, 1999, 2000, 2008; three Senior 'B' Club 2002, 2005, 2006; Leinster Senior 1999, 2000, 2001; Junior Gael Linn Cup with Leinster 1999; Leinster Senior Colleges with Coláiste Bríde 1996; Purple and Gold Star 2008.

References

External links
 Camogie.ie Official Camogie Association Website

1978 births
Living people
Wexford camogie players